This is a list of places on the Victorian Heritage Register in the City of Hume in Victoria, Australia. The Victorian Heritage Register is maintained by the Heritage Council of Victoria.

The Victorian Heritage Register, as of 2020, lists the following 17 state-registered places within the City of Hume:

References

Hume
City of Hume